Ureaplasma loridis  is a species of Ureaplasma, a genus of bacteria belonging to the family Mycoplasmataceae.

References 

Ureaplasma